William Lewis Manly  (April 6, 1820 – February 5, 1903) was an American pioneer of the mid-19th century. He was first a fur hunter, a guide of westward bound caravans, a seeker of gold, and then a farmer and writer in his later years.

He wrote an autobiography, first published with the title From Vermont to California, then a second edition with the title  Death Valley in '49, that tells of the pioneer experience in the Far West, in particular the 1848 California Gold Rush.

Early years 
Manly was born near St. Albans, Vermont, the son of Ebenezer Manly and Phoebe (Calkins) Manly. In 1829, at the age of nine, Manly left for Ohio with his family.  Later, as a pioneer, he went to Michigan, prior to statehood. He then went fur trapping in Wisconsin, in Ohio, and in the Dakota Territory.

California gold rush 

In 1849, at the age of twenty-nine, Manly joined the thousands of American Forty-niners traveling to California to participate in the Gold Rush. He began traveling overland from Wisconsin.

Floating the Green River
Upon reaching the Green River, just west of South Pass Manly and a half dozen other men tried to float to California by use of an abandoned ferry they found down the Green to the Colorado River, then on to California. As had William Henry Ashley done almost twenty-five years previously, they put in the river in Wyoming, and floated through the canyon of the Gates of Lodore.  But, unlike Ashley, who disembarked at the mouth of the Duchesne River after experiencing the treacherous canyon, Manly may have traveled further down, to present day Green River, Utah where the Old Spanish Trail crossed the river.  Wherever they did disembark, they were met by Chief Walkara, who helped them to travel overland to the Wasatch Front. It was twenty years later, 1869, that John Wesley Powell's party was successful in floating further down the Green to the Colorado, then on to the California/Arizona border.

Overland to California

South of present-day Provo, Utah, Manly joined other Forty-niners traveling to southern California.  In December, these pioneers became lost in the Great Basin Desert, and entered Death Valley having followed an inaccurate map for three weeks.  Their food supplies were almost exhausted, and the oxen pulling their wagons were dying of starvation. Manly and his associate John Haney Rogers trekked 250 miles on foot across the Mojave Desert to Rancho San Fernando near Los Angeles, California to scout an evacuation route for the families trapped in Death Valley. There, they procured food and horses from Mexican villagers and were able to save their party by leading them to Rancho San Francisco.

Life in California 
Manly worked the gold fields for several months, then returned to his farm in Wisconsin via steamboat, crossing the isthmus of Panama overland.  In 1851, Manly returned to California by the same method, arriving in San Francisco shortly after the fire of 1851 and continued in the goldfields until the fall of 1859, by which time he had saved enough money to buy land  in the Communications Hill, San Jose area, paying $16 an acre, $4,000 in all, where he planted a farm. In 1862, at the age of 42, Manly married Mary Jane Woods of Lodi, California.

Autobiography 

Manly wrote his first manuscript, referencing his diary (or notes) in early 1851 after returning east.  He had it sent it to his parents to keep for him, but it burned in their farmhouse shortly thereafter.  Upon learning this, he decided to put the traumatic past events behind him, and stopped keeping his diary.  Thirty years later, his friends finally convinced him to recount his memories.  By this time, his diary was "lost" (probably also burned, perhaps purposely) but he recreated events from memory and in 1886, Manly published "From Vermont to California" in Santa Clara Valley, a monthly agricultural review.

In the compilation of his memories, Manly contacted all the relevant persons possible, then with the aid of a publishing assistant wrote the greater part of his autobiography; Death Valley in '49 was published as a book in 1894 at San Jose from Pacific Tree and Vine Company. The title change was ostensibly to encourage sales, although Death Valley is not spoken of until the tenth chapter. Manly recounts in the book how, as the Bennett and Arcane families began their climb out of the valley through the Panamint mountains south of Telescope Peak, someone in the group, probably Sarah Ann Bennett (née Dilley), or Mrs. J.B. Arcane, turned to take a last look eastward and said "Goodbye, Death Valley!"

Only one of the emigrants, a Capt. Culverwell, died within the confines of the valley itself, while two other people, who Manly remembers in his book as Mr. Fish and Mr. Isham, were found dead along the trail west of the Panamint Range by Manly and his partner John Haney Rogers. Fish and Isham were members of another group of emigrants who called themselves the Jayhawkers, who had been traveling alongside the Bennett–Arcane Party from Salt Lake, Utah. The Jayhawkers had left the Bennetts sometime in the second or third week of December 1849 and walked out of Death Valley after butchering the last of their oxen for jerky along a path north of Telescope Peak, perhaps through the pass north of Tucki Mountain. This pass is today known as Towne Pass, after Captain Towne, the leader of "The Mississippi Boys" group of the 1849 Death Valley pioneers, and carries State Route 190 from Olancha to Stovepipe Wells. J. B. Arcane was possibly an emigrant from the Basque region of France; if so, the correct spelling of his name would be "Arcan". The first names of many of the 1849 Death Valley pioneers, including Captain Culverwell, Mr. Fish, Mr. Isham, and Captain Towne, are lost to history.

Death 
On February 5, 1903, Manly died at his home near Lodi, California.

Legacy
Manly rescued several families of pioneers from Death Valley during the 1849 California Gold Rush. For this reason, three geographic features in Death Valley bear his name: the Manly Beacon near Zabriskie Point, Manly Peak, situated to the south between Panamint Valley and the Death Valley, and Lake Manly, the ancient dried lake in the Valley.

The actor Brad Johnson portrayed Manley on the first episode, "How Death Valley Got Its Name", of the 18-year syndicated television anthology series, Death Valley Days, originally hosted by Stanley Andrews. Phyllis Coates, in the first of her seven appearances on the program, was cast as the pioneer woman, Virginia Arcane.

See also
 Christian Brevoort Zabriskie 
 Walter E. Scott
 John Haney Rogers
 Francis Marion Smith
 Places of interest in the Death Valley area

References

External links
 
 
 California as I saw it, First Person Narratives of California 1849-1900, Collection, Rare Book and Collectors, The Library of Congress
 
 William Lewis Manly, Death Valley in '49, Library of Congress
 
 Tentative Census of the 1849 Sand Walking Party by historian Carl I. Wheat
 
	

Death Valley
History of the Mojave Desert region
19th-century American businesspeople
1820 births
1903 deaths
People from St. Albans, Vermont
American pioneers
California pioneers
19th-century American writers
American diarists
People of the California Gold Rush
19th-century diarists